Senator McCall may refer to:

Carl McCall (born 1935), New York State Senate
James McCall (politician) (1774–1856), New York State Senate
John T. McCall (1863–1950), New York State Senate